Nash Morris (born 14 May 2003) is an Australian racing driver. Nicknamed "The Flash", he is the son of former Supercars Championship driver Paul Morris, and drives for his father's Paul Morris Motorsport in the Super2 Series and Trans Am Series Australia. He won the Super3 Series in 2021.

Morris has also raced in the Toyota 86 Racing Series, TA2 Racing Australia Muscle Car Series, Track Attack Excel Cup, and Boost Mobile Super Trucks.

Career results

Boost Mobile Super Trucks 
(key) (Bold – Pole position. Italics – Fastest qualifier. * – Most laps led.)

Complete Super3 Series results
(key) (Race results only)

Complete Super2 Series results
(key) (Race results only)

References

External links
Driver Database profile

2003 births
Living people
Australian racing drivers
Stadium Super Trucks drivers